Patricia Annette Olson (September 21, 1935 – October 14, 2007), known by her stage name Sigrid Valdis, was an American actress who played "Hilda" in the American television series Hogan's Heroes.

Early life and career
Valdis began acting in the late 1950s. She appeared in bit parts in films and guest starred in several television shows including The Wild Wild West and Kraft Television Theatre.  She appeared in one episode of Hogan's Heroes as a different character before landing the role of Hilda, Colonel Klink's secretary, replacing Cynthia Lynn ("Helga") who played the role in the first season.

Personal life
Valdis was married twice. Her first marriage was to fashion businessman George Gilbert Ateyeh, with whom she had a daughter, Melissa. Ateyeh died in 1967.

Valdis' second marriage was to Hogan's Heroes star Bob Crane on the set of the series on October 16, 1970. Co-star Richard Dawson served as Crane's best man. Following the birth of their son Robert Scott Crane in 1971, Valdis retired from acting. In 1978, she moved from the Los Angeles area after Crane was murdered.

In 1980, she moved to Seattle, where in 1998 she joined the cast of her son's syndicated weekly sketch comedy radio show, Shaken, Not Stirred. In 2004, she moved back to her childhood home in Westwood. Though no longer using her stage name, she later oversaw a tribute website to her husband, with a blog where she answered questions from fans of her husband and Hogan's Heroes.

Death

Twice widowed, Valdis died on October 14, 2007, from lung cancer in Anaheim, California, aged 72. She had two daughters, Melissa Smith and Ana Sarmiento, and a son, Scott. She had three stepchildren from Crane's earlier marriage to Anne Terzian: Karen, Deborah, and Robert David Crane.

Filmography

References

External links
 
 
 Reference to Valdis, insideedition.com; accessed March 8, 2017.

1935 births
2007 deaths
Actresses from Bakersfield, California
American film actresses
American television actresses
Actresses from California
American people of Swedish descent
Deaths from lung cancer in California
Burials at Westwood Village Memorial Park Cemetery
20th-century American actresses
21st-century American women